Carlislehoekspruit Pass, (English: Carlisle is a surname, hoek is Corner, spruit is a brook), is situated in the Eastern Cape province of South Africa, on the road between Rhodes and the Tiffindell Ski Resort near Ben Macdhui.

 Driving skill level: Intermediate to expert.
 Make use of local knowledge before attempting the drive and be sure to take warm clothing with you, just in case.
 Road condition: Gravel surface (some sections partially covered with concrete).
 Remarks: Very steep. Some hair raising bends. Very scenic.

Mountain passes of the Eastern Cape